USS Oscar Austin (DDG-79) is an  in the United States Navy. Oscar Austin is named for Medal of Honor and Purple Heart recipient Private First Class Oscar P. Austin. This ship is the 29th destroyer of her class. USS Oscar Austin was the 17th ship of this class to be built by Bath Iron Works in Bath, Maine, and construction began on 9 October 1997. She was launched and christened on 7 November 1998. On 19 August 2000 she was commissioned at Bath, Maine. As of July 2021 the ship is part of Destroyer Squadron 2 based out of Naval Station Norfolk.

Flight IIA ships 

Compared to previous Burkes, Flight IIAs are  longer, displace about 900 tons more, carry six more Vertical Launching System cells, and have a hangar that can house two SH-60 Seahawk helicopters. To prevent the additional superstructure aft from fouling radar returns, the rear-facing SPY-1D panels are one deck higher.

Service history
USS Oscar Austins maiden deployment in late 2002 resulted in her participation in the opening strikes of Operation Iraqi Freedom. She was deployed in September 2005, once again in support of Operation Iraqi Freedom. She returned from a successful deployment in March 2006.

As of 2007, USS Oscar Austin was operating in Destroyer Squadron 26.

As of 2008, USS Oscar Austin is the first combatant ship to deploy with a Scan Eagle UAV developed and flown by Insitu Inc.

As of 2015, USS Oscar Austin was operating in Destroyer Squadron 26.

On 10 November 2018, a fire broke out on Oscar Austin. The fire caused one sailor to be transported to a local hospital for smoke inhalation.

Coat of arms

Shield 
The shield has background of blue with red flames. The center encompasses a white globe with a reversed star center over an anchor.The traditional Navy colors were chosen for the shield because dark blue and gold represents the sea and excellence respectively. Red signifies sacrifice and valor and white stands for integrity and purity of purpose. A reversed star represents the Medal of Honor awarded to Private First Class Oscar P. Austin, United States Marine Corps, for self-sacrifice and heroism he showed when throwing himself between an enemy grenade and an injured Marine. A white globe with a blue reversed star in the center are the Medal of Honor ribbon colors, while the reversed star is the silhouette of the pendant. The globe and anchor, also the USMC seal, signify the U.S. Navy's global mission. The flames represent the fire swept terrain as well as enemy fire where Austin sacrificed his life for comrades.

Crest 
The crest consists of an eagle surrounded by crossing tridents and rice stalk.Representing Oscar Austin's modern warfare capabilities such as the AEGIS combat systems are the tridents; symbols of sea prowess. The tridents' tines denote various warfare areas: air, surface, undersea. The crossed tridents prove multiple capabilities. The surrounding rice stalks signify Vietnam, where Austin served. The eagle symbolizes freedom, the principles of which the country were founded, and the sacrifice of his own life for others' freedom.

Motto
The motto is written on a scroll of gold with blue trim.The ship's motto is "Honor and Sacrifice". The motto is a reference to the honorable sacrifice of Private First Class Oscar P. Austin and the Medal of Honor he received.

Seal 
The coat of arms in full color as in the blazon, upon a white background enclosed within a dark blue oval border edged on the outside with a gold rope and bearing the inscription "USS Oscar Austin" at the top and "DDG 79" in the base all gold.

References

External links

 

Arleigh Burke-class destroyers
Destroyers of the United States
Ships built in Bath, Maine
1998 ships